Fülöp, also spelled Fulop in other languages, is a Hungarian surname meaning Philip. Notable people with this surname include:

Catherine Fulop, Venezuelan actress
Ferenc Fülöp, Hungarian footballer
István Fülöp, Hungarian politician
Márton Fülöp, Hungarian footballer
Mihály Fülöp, Hungarian fencer
Noel Fülöp, Hungarian footballer
Péter Fülöp (diplomat), Hungarian diplomat
Rob Fulop, American game programmer
Steven Fulop, American politician
Zoltán Fülöp, Hungarian footballer
Fülöp Bucao, Filipino-Canadian (first name)

Hungarian-language surnames